Petla "Puri" Jagannadh (born 28 September 1966) is an Indian film director, screenwriter, and producer, who works primarily in the Telugu film Industry. He made his directorial debut with the Telugu film Badri starring Pawan Kalyan, Renu Desai and Ameesha Patel. In 2006, he directed the Telugu film Pokiri, premiered at the 7th IIFA Film Festival held in Dubai. The film was later re-made into several Indian languages, and brought Puri widespread Indian recognition. He made his Hindi film debut in 2004, with the film Shart: The Challenge. In 2011, he directed the Hindi film Bbuddah... Hoga Terra Baap starring Amitabh Bachchan, which was archived in the Oscar library. 

He also produces films under his co-owned production companies, Puri Jagannadh Touring Talkies, Vaishno Academy and Puri Connects in partnership with actress Charmme Kaur. He owns a music company called Puri Sangeet. The box office hits that he directed, in addition to Badri, including films Itlu Sravani Subramanyam, Appu, Idiot, Amma Nanna O Tamila Ammayi, Sivamani, Pokiri, Desamuduru, Golimaar, Businessman, Iddarammayilatho, Heart Attack, Temper and iSmart Shankar.

Early life 
Puri Jagannadh was born on 28 September 1966 in Pithapuram, Andhra Pradesh. His native place is Bapiraju Kothapalli village of Anakapalli district in Andhra Pradesh. He was schooled at St. Theresa High School, Pedda Boddapalli and graduated from A. M. A. L. College, Anakapalle in 1986.

His first younger brother, Petla Uma Sankara Ganesh is an MLA from Narsipatnam, YSR Congress Party, while second younger brother Sairam Shankar is an actor.

He married Lavanya in 1996. The couple has a son, Akash and a daughter, Pavithra. His son Akash made his film debut as a lead in Mehbooba (2018).

Career
Puri started his film directional career as an assistant director to Ram Gopal Varma for several Telugu films mainly of action genre. His Telugu film directorial debut, Badri starred Pawan Kalyan. Apart from Telugu films, he has also worked in the Kannada film industry and introduced Puneeth Rajkumar with the film Appu. In 2011 he worked with Amitabh Bachchan in the film Bbuddah... Hoga Terra Baap. 

In 2020, Jagannadh directed action film Liger, which is being produced by Dharma Productions and Charmme Kaur. It stars Vijay Deverakonda and Ananya Panday in lead roles.

Filmography 

Acting
 Siva (1989)
 Ye Maaya Chesave (2010) as himself
 Businessman (2012) as a taxi driver
 Temper (2015) as a biker
 ISmart Shankar (2019) as himself 
 Romantic (2021) as himself in a song
 Liger (2022) as himself in the song "Coka 2.0"
 Godfather (2022)  as Govardhan
 Ori Devuda (2022) as himself
 ISM (2016) as a hotel customer

References

External links

 
 
 

1966 births
Living people
21st-century Indian film directors
Telugu film directors
Kannada film directors
Filmfare Awards South winners
Telugu screenwriters
21st-century Indian dramatists and playwrights
Telugu film producers
Hindi film producers
Film producers from Andhra Pradesh
Screenwriters from Andhra Pradesh
People from Visakhapatnam district
People from Uttarandhra
21st-century Indian screenwriters
Film directors from Andhra Pradesh
Film people from Andhra Pradesh
Indian male screenwriters
People from Visakhapatnam